Senecio angulatus, also known as creeping groundsel 
and Cape ivy,
is a succulent flowering plant in the family Asteraceae that is native to South Africa. Cape ivy is a scrambling and a twining herb that can become an aggressive weed once established, making it an invasive species. It has been naturalised in the Mediterranean Basin, where it is grown as an ornamental plant for its satiny foliage and sweet-scented flowers. Other names include climbing groundsel, Algerian senecio, and scrambling groundsel. 

Cape ivy can be distinguished vegetatively from Delairea odorata (German ivy) by the lack of lobes at the leaf stalk base, the fleshy leaf surface, the outwardly curved leaf teeth, stiff stems, a more rambling habit, and the ray florets with petal-like ligules. In Australia, Senecio tamoides (Canary creeper) may usually be misapplied and is considered to be Senecio angulatus.

Description

Leaves and stems

They are thick, glossy, fleshy and coarsely toothed, with one to three teeth each side and bluntly lobed, with upper leaves becoming smaller with fewer teeth or none at all. They have a frosted look from a powdery coating on the lower side.

The stems are succulent, pale green, and are often variegated with pale yellow green and purple. They are slightly angular (not upright) and usually sparingly branched. Neither stems nor leaves are hairy.

Inflorescence

Senecio angulatus produces numerous flowers in open clusters at the end of its branches or stems. The honey-scented flowers are on an elongated stem and open in succession from the base up as the stem continues to grow. Often the cluster droops with the flower heads at the end of the cluster turning upwards.

Attached to flower stalks are 8-11 fine pointed bracts  which are surrounded by 4-7 pale green and sometimes purple tinged  supplementary bracts at the base,  which make a cup shape around the base of the involucre.

Individual flower-heads are radiate and urn-shaped. The corolla has a disc comprising 10-15 dull golden yellow disc florets.

An autumn-winter bloomer, the plant flowers from April to May in Southern Africa and May to July in Australia and New Zealand. In the northern hemisphere, particularly in Italy and Spain, it flowers from November to the end of January.

Fruits and reproduction
Cape ivy is easily dispersed by wind-blown seed, stem fragments, dumped garden waste and by the expansion of the plant through runners.

Cultivation

History
 
Cape ivy is cultivated in parts of North Africa, Southern Europe and the Levant, where it was introduced in Malta in the 15th century as an ornamental plant. In Queensland, cape ivy may have increased in popularity following the Boer War, as there were anecdotal accounts that it was introduced from South Africa by the soldiers who returned to Australia after 1902. Moreover, it was displayed in garden pillars in Brisbane newspapers between 1906 and 1910, praising the plant for the beauty of both its foliage and its yellow clusters of blooms. Though these reports may have falsely applied the S. angulatus name to Senecio tamoides, which was a weed at that time on the east coast.

The plant was collected as a weed in Melbourne's southern suburb of Mornington in 1936, and was displayed in newspaper column submissions in areas between Bendigo and Swan Hill in the 1940s and 1950s. In Melbourne metropolitan area, it became prevalent on coastal banks and on decomposed rock gullies of suburban creeks. It was introduced in New Zealand in 1940 as an ornamental.

Propagation
Cape ivy grows in USDA hardiness zones 9a through 11b and is medium to fast-growing. Very drought tolerant, it would flourish better with some water in the summer and would bloom more often in full sun. It can grow indoors as a houseplant, provided it gets some sunlight. Pruning is necessary as the plant can become limp when it gets taller.

Propagation can be done by cuttings (as the plant easily roots from the branch tips), and this is to be conducted between spring and fall. Seeds prefer consistent moisture and warm temperatures to germinate. Although some sources indicate that its seeds are unviable. Annual fertilisation is necessary, though not mandatory. Pests include aphids.

Medicinal
Phytochemical profiling showed antioxidant and anti-acetylcholinesterase activities in extracts from Algerian Senecio angulatus. The hydro-methanolic and the acetate extracts have exhibited  antioxidant potential of acetate for FRAP and phenanthroline methods. Furthermore, a high amount of cynarin and trans-ferulic acid was found in the extract whereas butanolic infusion had recorded the highest amount of chlorogenic acid. Though phenolic compounds tend to have hydroxyl in their composition, contributing to the antioxidant activity.

Distribution

It is native to the Cape Province in South Africa, hence its name. Cape ivy has been naturalized in parts of South Italy, France, Portugal and some coastal areas in southeastern Australia. It is invasive in New Zealand and an environmental weed in Victoria, Australia. Because it is aggressive, it can smother the existing native vegetation both in the ground layer and canopy, thus altering the light climate in the invaded community and sometimes suppress the regeneration of native plants.

Afrotropic
East Tropical Africa: Uganda, Kenya, Tanzania
Southern Africa: South Africa (native)
Australasia
Australia: Western Australia (Esperance Plains, Warren, Swan Coastal Plain), New South Wales (South Coast and Mid North Coast), southern Victoria and Tasmania.
New Zealand: Nelson City, Wairau Bar, Marlborough and Banks Peninsula
Palearctic
Northern Africa: Tunisia, Libya and Algeria
Macaronesia: Canary Islands (Gran Canaria, Hierro, Tenerife), Balearic Islands (Ibiza, Formentera, Mallorca, Menorca)
Southwestern Europe: Corsica, Channel Islands, Spain, France & Monaco, Portugal
Southeastern Europe: Italy, Sardinia, Sicily, Albania, Croatia and surrounding islands 
Sources: GRIN, FBAF, NSWF, NZPND, BGB

Habitat
Cape ivy prefers soils of black calcareous and grey sand, sandy clay and limestone. It finds homes with these soils in coastal areas on cliff faces, mudflats, wet depressions in dunes, near swamps, in landfills, scrubland and near settlements, especially near the sea.

Other names
 (senecio angular)
 (creeping senecio)
 (cape ivy, senecio ivy)

 (telephone cord, cat's footprint, climbing groundsel, polygonal sheikh/senecio)
 (climbing groundsel)

Gallery

References

External links

angulatus
Flora of Southern Africa
Creepers of South Africa
Garden plants
Ornamental plants
Vines
Garden plants of Southern Africa
Flora naturalised in Australia
Plants described in 1781
Succulent plants
Drought-tolerant plants